Jerry "Wonda" Duplessis (born 9 August 1975) is a Haitian music producer, film score composer, entrepreneur and philanthropist. His first major success was as a producer for the Fugees' 1996 album The Score. He also played the bass guitar with the Fugees, and group member Wyclef Jean is his cousin.

Music career

Early life
Jerry "Wonda" Duplessis was born and raised in a suburb of Port-au-Prince, Haiti. At 14, he began playing the bass. Early influences at this time included Aston Barrett, and James Jamerson. At 16, he was sent to the US and was raised by his father and his aunt who was also Wyclef's mother. The basement of their family home soon became their home studio.

From church to some time at the Institute of Audio Research, and gigs wherever he could play, their home studio "Booga Basement" was opened serving artists near New Jersey. Wyclef, Samuel Pras Michel, and Lauryn Hill would then unite to create a new Caribbean style group ultimately known as the Fugees. Wonda and Wyclef would align to provide production for the group which would be signed by Ruffhouse/Columbia. Label mates at the time would include Cypress Hill and Kris Kross.

Jerry Wonda/Wyclef Jean years
 Jerry Wonda and Wyclef Jean's producing would take off with the Fugees. Their cover of the Roberta Flack classic, "Killing Me Softly" sung by lead vocalist Lauryn Hill reached No. 2 on the Pop charts and No. 1 on the R&B charts. Co-produced by Wonda, their album The Score would become one of the best-selling hip hop albums of all time gaining worldwide recognition.

Wonda would divide his time touring as a bassist and musical director with the Fugees and producing for upcoming artists such as Destiny's Child with a remix of "No No No". He attributes his musical success to tailoring each of his productions specifically tailored to a particular artist. “When we are on stage every song is different, every show is different, and when working with other artists, I make the beat for the specific artist,” Wonda explained. “I find out what fits each artist before delivering the song.”  Several productions ranging from hip hop, pop, R&B, rock, soul and reggae would follow.

Wonda and Wyclef would make history in 2000. Santana's Supernatural single "Maria Maria", which Wonda co-produced, held the No. 1 chart position for 10 weeks. In 2006, the duo produced Shakira's worldwide hit "Hips Don't Lie" from the album Oral Fixation Vol. 2. It became the top-selling song of the 21st century and reached No. 1 in more than 50 countries, leading Shakira to be the 1st female Colombian singer to top Billboard'''s Hot 100 chart. They also co-wrote "My Love Is Your Love" for Whitney Houston's album of the same name.

Film scoring
In 1996, Wonda would co-produce the Fugees all-star Ali tribute "Rumble in the Jungle" featuring A Tribe Called Quest and Busta Rhymes for the Muhammad Ali documentary When We Were Kings. The Warren Beatty film Bulworth includes "Ghetto Superstar" performed by Pras Michel, ODB and Mýa and "How Come" by Senegalese singer Youssou N'Dour and rapper Canibus.

Alongside Wyclef and Andrea Guerra, Wonda wrote and produced the theme song "Million Voices" for the film Hotel Rwanda, which was nominated for a Golden Globe in 2005. The same song was later nominated for a Grammy Award in 2006. Other film credits include The Manchurian Candidate, Dave Chappelle's Block Party and 50 First Dates''.

In 2001, Wonda built Platinum Sound Recording Studios in Times Square, NYC.

Yéle Haiti

Wonda and Wyclef co-founded non-profit Yéle Haiti providing assistance to Haiti in education, health, environment and community development. “We created Yele Haiti because we are from Haiti,” said Wonda. “We want to give people from the impoverished nation equal access to education and opportunity and equip them with the necessary tools to be self reliant.” Wonda has hosted several diplomats and activists to the country including former President Bill Clinton, Angelina Jolie, and Petra Nemcova.

Since 2009
In 2009, Wonda began producing music on his own, founding a production company called Wonda Music and placing his first major record with teen sensation, Justin Bieber for "U Smile." He has since followed up several placements to include artists Mary J. Blige, Musiq Soulchild, Keri Hilson, Estelle, Busta Rhymes, Miguel and Lupe Fiasco. Wonda began signing artists, producers, and songwriters to his Wonda Music imprint.

Artists currently on the Wonda Music roster include Cokah, Famey, Viviane Ndour (Viviane), Alex Boyé, and Destiny Moriah. Producers include Arden 'Keyz' Altino, Klase '1st Klase' Gonzalez, 'Murk da Mic', and Hardy Indigo.

Wonda also plays bass guitar as part of Melissa Etheridge's new touring band.

Producer and co-producer

See also
Jerry Wonda discography

References

External links
Jerry 'Wonder' Duplessis at Discogs

Hip hop record producers
Grammy Award winners
Living people
Wyclef Jean
Haitian musicians
People from Port-au-Prince
1975 births